The following outline is provided as an overview of and topical guide to Ecuador:

Ecuador – representative democratic republic in South America, bordered by Colombia on the north, by Peru on the east and south, and by the Pacific Ocean to the west. The country also includes the Galápagos Islands (Archipiélago de Colón) in the Pacific, about 965 kilometers (600 mi) west of the mainland. Ecuador straddles the equator, from which it takes its name, and has an area of 256,371 square kilometers (98,985 sq mi). Its capital city is Quito, and its largest city is Guayaquil.

General reference

 Pronunciation: 
 Common English country name: Ecuador
 Official English country name: The Republic of Ecuador
 Common endonym: Ecuador
 Official endonym: República del Ecuador (literally: Republic of the Equator)
 Adjectival(s): Ecuadorian 
 Demonym(s):
 Etymology: Name of Ecuador
 International rankings of Ecuador
 ISO country codes: EC, ECU, 218
 ISO region codes: See ISO 3166-2:EC
 Internet country code top-level domain: .ec

Geography of Ecuador

Geography of Ecuador
 Ecuador is: an equatorial megadiverse country
 Location:
 Western Hemisphere, on the equator
 South America
 Time zones:
 Galápagos Islands – Galápagos Time (UTC-06)
 Rest of Ecuador – Ecuador Time (UTC-05)
 Extreme points of Ecuador
 High:  Chimborazo  – farthest point from the center of the Earth
 Low:  Pacific Ocean 0 m
 Land boundaries:  2,010 km
 1,420 km
 590 km
 Coastline:  Pacific Ocean 2,237 km
 Population of Ecuador: 13,755,680 people (2007 estimate) - 65th most populous country
 Area of Ecuador:   - 73rd largest country
 Atlas of Ecuador

Environment of Ecuador

Environment of Ecuador
 Climate of Ecuador
 Earthquakes in Ecuador
 National parks of Ecuador
 Wildlife of Ecuador
 Fauna of Ecuador
 Birds of Ecuador
 Mammals of Ecuador

Geographic features of Ecuador

 Glaciers of Ecuador
 Islands of Ecuador
 Mountains of Ecuador
 Volcanoes in Ecuador
 Rivers of Ecuador
 World Heritage Sites in Ecuador

Regions of Ecuador

Regions of Ecuador

Administrative divisions of Ecuador

Administrative divisions of Ecuador
 Regions of Ecuador
 Provinces of Ecuador, see also Province
 Cantons of Ecuador, see also Canton
 Parishes of Ecuador, see also Parish

Provinces of Ecuador

Provinces of Ecuador

 Azuay (1)
 Bolívar (2)
 Cañar (3)
 Carchi (4)
 Chimborazo (5)
 Cotopaxi (6)
 El Oro (7)
 Esmeraldas (8)
 Galápagos (9)
 Guayas (10)
 Imbabura (11)
 Loja (12)

 Los Ríos (13)
 Manabí (14)
 Morona Santiago (15)
 Napo (16)
 Orellana (17)
 Pastaza (18)
 Pichincha (19)
 Santa Elena (20)
 Santo Domingo de los Tsáchilas (21)
 Sucumbíos (22)
 Tungurahua (23)
 Zamora-Chinchipe (24)

Cantons of Ecuador

Cantons of Ecuador

Parishes of Ecuador

Parishes of Ecuador

Municipalities of Ecuador

Municipalities of Ecuador
 Cities of Ecuador
 Capital of Ecuador: Quito
 Province capitals of Ecuador

Demography of Ecuador

Demographics of Ecuador

Nations of Ecuador
Ecuador is a plurinational state.  In addition to whites, blacks, and mestizos, many Ecuadorians belong to indigenous nations, principally:
Achuar
Awá
Chachi
Cofán
Huaorani
Kichua
Secoya
Shuar
Siona
Tsáchila
Huancavilca
Záparo

Government and politics of Ecuador

Government of Ecuador
Politics of Ecuador
 Form of government: Presidential representative democratic republic
 Capital of Ecuador: Quito
 Elections in Ecuador
 Liberalism and radicalism in Ecuador
 Political parties in Ecuador

Branches of the government of Ecuador

Government of Ecuador

Executive branch of the government of Ecuador
 Head of state: President of Ecuador
 Head of government: President of Ecuador
 Cabinet of Ecuador

Legislative branch of the government of Ecuador
 National Congress of Ecuador
 Ecuadorian Constituent Assembly

Judicial branch of the government of Ecuador

Court system of Ecuador
 Supreme Court of Ecuador

Foreign relations of Ecuador

Foreign relations of Ecuador

International organization membership

The Republic of Ecuador is a member of:

Agency for the Prohibition of Nuclear Weapons in Latin America and the Caribbean (OPANAL)
Andean Community of Nations (CAN)
Food and Agriculture Organization (FAO)
Group of 77 (G77)
Inter-American Development Bank (IADB)
International Atomic Energy Agency (IAEA)
International Bank for Reconstruction and Development (IBRD)
International Chamber of Commerce (ICC)
International Civil Aviation Organization (ICAO)
International Criminal Court (ICCt)
International Criminal Police Organization (Interpol)
International Development Association (IDA)
International Federation of Red Cross and Red Crescent Societies (IFRCS)
International Finance Corporation (IFC)
International Fund for Agricultural Development (IFAD)
International Hydrographic Organization (IHO)
International Labour Organization (ILO)
International Maritime Organization (IMO)
International Monetary Fund (IMF)
International Olympic Committee (IOC)
International Organization for Migration (IOM)
International Organization for Standardization (ISO)
International Red Cross and Red Crescent Movement (ICRM)
International Telecommunication Union (ITU)
International Telecommunications Satellite Organization (ITSO)
International Trade Union Confederation (ITUC)
Inter-Parliamentary Union (IPU)
Latin American Economic System (LAES)
Latin American Integration Association (LAIA)

Multilateral Investment Guarantee Agency (MIGA)
Nonaligned Movement (NAM)
Organisation for the Prohibition of Chemical Weapons (OPCW)
Organization of American States (OAS)
Organization of Petroleum Exporting Countries (OPEC)
Permanent Court of Arbitration (PCA)
Rio Group (RG)
Southern Cone Common Market (Mercosur) (associate)
Unión Latina
United Nations (UN)
Union of South American Nations (UNASUR)
United Nations Conference on Trade and Development (UNCTAD)
United Nations Educational, Scientific, and Cultural Organization (UNESCO)
United Nations High Commissioner for Refugees (UNHCR)
United Nations Industrial Development Organization (UNIDO)
United Nations Mission in Liberia (UNMIL)
United Nations Mission in the Central African Republic and Chad (MINURCAT)
United Nations Mission in the Sudan (UNMIS)
United Nations Operation in Côte d'Ivoire (UNOCI)
United Nations Stabilization Mission in Haiti (MINUSTAH)
Universal Postal Union (UPU)
World Confederation of Labour (WCL)
World Customs Organization (WCO)
World Federation of Trade Unions (WFTU)
World Health Organization (WHO)
World Intellectual Property Organization (WIPO)
World Meteorological Organization (WMO)
World Tourism Organization (UNWTO)
World Trade Organization (WTO)

Law and order in Ecuador

Law of Ecuador
 Capital punishment in Ecuador
 Constitution of Ecuador
 Crime in Ecuador
 Human rights in Ecuador
 LGBT rights in Ecuador
 Freedom of religion in Ecuador
 Law enforcement in Ecuador
 Same-sex marriage in Ecuador

Military of Ecuador

Military of Ecuador
 Command
 Commander-in-chief:
 Ministry of Defence of Ecuador
 Forces
 Army of Ecuador
 Navy of Ecuador
 Air Force of Ecuador
 Military history of Ecuador
 Military ranks of Ecuador

History of Ecuador

History of Ecuador
 Timeline of the history of Ecuador
 Current events of Ecuador
 Military history of Ecuador

Culture of Ecuador

Culture of Ecuador
 Cuisine of Ecuador
 List of Ecuadorian dishes and foods
 Festivals in Ecuador
 Carnival in Ecuador
 Languages of Ecuador
 National symbols of Ecuador
 Coat of arms of Ecuador
 Flag of Ecuador
 National anthem of Ecuador
 Prostitution in Ecuador
 Public holidays in Ecuador
 Religion in Ecuador
 Christianity in Ecuador
 Hinduism in Ecuador
 Islam in Ecuador
 Judaism in Ecuador
 World Heritage Sites in Ecuador

Art in Ecuador

 Cinema of Ecuador
 Music of Ecuador
 Television in Ecuador

Sports in Ecuador

Sports in Ecuador
 Ecuador at the Olympics
 Football in Ecuador

Science and technology

Ecuadorian Civilian Space Agency (Agencia Espacial Civil Ecuatoriana, EXA)

Economy and infrastructure of Ecuador

Economy of Ecuador
 Economic rank, by nominal GDP (2007):  68th (sixty-eighth)
.ec Internet country code top-level domain for Ecuador
 Central Bank of Ecuador
 Communications in Ecuador
 Internet in Ecuador
 Companies of Ecuador
Currency of Ecuador: Dollar
ISO 4217: USD
 Mining in Ecuador
 Tourism in Ecuador
 Transport in Ecuador
 Airports in Ecuador
 Highways in Ecuador
 Rail transport in Ecuador
 Water supply and sanitation in Ecuador

Education in Ecuador

Education in Ecuador

Health in Ecuador

Health in Ecuador

See also

Index of Ecuador-related articles
List of Ecuador-related topics
List of international rankings
Member state of the United Nations
Outline of geography
Outline of South America
Wikipedia:WikiProject Library of Congress Country Studies/Ecuador

References

Map of Galapagos Islands http://www.freeworldmaps.net/southamerica/galapagos/map.html

External links

 President of Ecuador 
 

 
 
Ecuador